Cardiac aberrancy is a type of aberration in the shape of the  EKG  signal, representing activation of the heart muscle via the electrical conduction system of the heart.
Aberration occurs when the electrical activation of the heart, which is caused by a series of action potentials is conducting improperly, which can be due to:
 left anterior fascicular block
 left posterior fascicular block
 bundle branch block
 Wolff–Parkinson–White syndrome

See also
 Electrocardiography

Cardiac electrophysiology